Preaching Buddha is a sculpture in Salt Lake City's International Peace Gardens, in the U.S. state of Utah.

Description and history
The bronze bas-relief, which depicts Buddha on a lotus blossom, is set within a concrete base. Dedicated in 1965, the artwork measures approximately 35 x 18 x 7 in. A nearby plaque reads: "PREACHING BUDDHA / PRESENTED BY / GOVERNMENT OF INDIA / MINISTRY OF EDUCATION / TO / INTERNATIONAL PEACE GARDENS / BY / CONSUL GENERAL, P. N. MENON / DEDICATED APRIL 22, 1965". The artwork was surveyed by the Smithsonian Institution's "Save Outdoor Sculpture!" program in 1993.

References

Indian-American culture
Outdoor sculptures in Salt Lake City